Prince's Tale is a Canadian short documentary film, directed by Jamie Miller and released in 2018. The film profiles Prince Amponsah, a Toronto actor rebuilding his career as a performer after an apartment fire which left his body badly scarred and resulted in the amputation of both of his arms.

The film premiered at the 2018 Hot Docs Canadian International Documentary Festival, where it won the award for Best Canadian Short Documentary.

At the 7th Canadian Screen Awards in 2019, the film was shortlisted for Best Short Documentary.

References

External links 
 

2018 films
2018 short documentary films
Canadian short documentary films
Documentary films about actors
Documentary films about people with disability
Documentary films about Black Canadians
Films about amputees
2010s English-language films
2010s Canadian films